New Season is an album released by Donny and Marie Osmond in 1976.  It was recorded at Kolob Recording Studios in Los Angeles, California and Provo, Utah.  One single was released from the album, a cover of Marvin Gaye and Tammi Terrell's "Ain't Nothing Like the Real Thing," peaking  at No. 21 on the Billboard Hot 100.  The album reached No. 85 on the Billboard Top 200 chart on January 29, 1977.   It was certified Gold by the RIAA on January 12, 1978.

Track listing

Personnel

Produced by Alan Osmond, Michael Lloyd, Mike Curb
Recorded at Kolob Recording Studios
Art direction: Beverly Parker
Design: William Naegels
Engineered by Humberto Gatica, Wayne Osmond, Michael Lloyd

Certifications

References

1976 albums
Polydor Records albums
Donny Osmond albums
Marie Osmond albums
Albums produced by Mike Curb
Albums produced by Michael Lloyd (music producer)